The 1994 Family Circle Cup was a women's tennis tournament played on outdoor clay courts at the Sea Pines Plantation on Hilton Head Island, South Carolina in the United States that was part of Tier I of the 1994 WTA Tour. It was the 22nd edition of the tournament and was held from March 28 through April 3, 1994. Conchita Martínez won the singles title.

Finals

Singles

 Conchita Martínez defeated  Natasha Zvereva 6–4, 6–0
 It was Martínez's 1st title of the year and the 21st of her career.

Doubles

 Lori McNeil /  Arantxa Sánchez Vicario defeated  Gigi Fernández /  Natasha Zvereva 6–4, 4–1 (Fernández and Zvereva retired)
 It was McNeil's 1st title of the year and the 36th of her career. It was Sánchez Vicario's 3rd title of the year and the 41st of her career.

External links
 WTA tournament profile

Family Circle Cup
Charleston Open
Family Circle Cup
Family Circle Cup
Family Circle Cup
Family Circle Cup